Admiral Knowles may refer to:

Sir Charles Knowles, 1st Baronet (c. 1704–1777), British Royal Navy admiral
Sir Charles Knowles, 2nd Baronet (1754–1831), British Royal Navy admiral
Sir Charles Knowles, 4th Baronet (1832–1917), British Royal Navy vice admiral